Gombe General Hospital, also Gombe District Hospital or Gombe Hospital, is a hospital in the Central Region of Uganda.

Location

Overview
Gombe Hospital was established in 1969 by the first government of Prime Minister Milton Obote. It is a general hospital that serves the population of Butambala District and that of Gomba District and parts of the districts of Mpigi and Mityana, a population of about 250,000 human beings.

Renovations
In 2015, the Government of Uganda, with loans from International Development Partners, began the renovation of 25 public general hospitals, including Gombe General Hospital. In 2013, the hospital's laboratory, underwent renovations under a joint program by PEPFAR and USAID, known as SUSTAIN. In 2014, the hospital beds were refurbished and bedding supplied by the Canadian NGO called CanAssist African Relief Trust, at a cost of approximately $5,000.

Recent developments
In 2015, the hospital adopted palliative care, as part of its vision and mission.

See also
List of hospitals in Uganda

References

External links
  Website of Uganda Ministry of Health
 Website of Butambala District Local Government
 130 get free hernia surgery in Butambala

Gombe
Butambala District
1969 establishments in Uganda
Hospital buildings completed in 1969
Central Region, Uganda